The Vancouver Canucks are a professional ice hockey team based in Vancouver, British Columbia, Canada. They play at the 18,810-capacity Rogers Arena. They are members of the Pacific Division of the Western Conference of the National Hockey League (NHL). The Canucks joined the NHL in 1970 as an expansion team alongside the Buffalo Sabres. In the Canucks' -year NHL history, the team has advanced three times to the Stanley Cup Finals. They were defeated in all three attempts; once in a four-game sweep by the New York Islanders in 1982, and the other two times in a seven-game series by the New York Rangers in 1994, and by the Boston Bruins in 2011.

The Canucks selected Dale Tallon, a defenceman from the Toronto Marlboros, with their first pick, second overall in the 1970 NHL Amateur Draft. The Canucks also drafted Trevor Linden from the Medicine Hat Tigers in 1988. Linden would serve as the Canucks president of hockey operations from 2014 to 2018. All-time, the Canucks had 15 top-five draft picks, but have never received the first overall pick. The Canucks are one of the two franchises in the NHL to have drafted two twin brothers in the same year—they drafted Daniel Sedin second overall and Henrik Sedin third overall in 1999.

Key

1970 Draft

1971 Draft

1972 Draft

1973 Draft

1974 Draft

1975 Draft

1976 Draft

1977 Draft

1978 Draft

1979 Draft

1980 Draft

1981 Draft

1982 Draft

1983 Draft

1984 Draft

1985 Draft

1986 Draft

1987 Draft

1988 Draft

1989 Draft

1990 Draft

1991 Draft

1992 Draft

1993 Draft

1994 Draft

1995 Draft

1996 Draft

1997 Draft

1998 Draft

1999 Draft

2000 Draft

2001 Draft

2002 Draft

2003 Draft

2004 Draft

2005 Draft

2006 Draft

2007 Draft

2008 Draft

2009 Draft

2010 Draft

2011 Draft

2012 Draft

2013 Draft

2014 Draft

2015 Draft

2016 Draft

2017 Draft

2018 Draft

2019 Draft

2020 Draft

2021 Draft

2022 Draft

Notes
Rick Lanz was born in Czechoslovakia but defected to Canada in 1968.
Petr Nedved was born in Czechoslovakia but defected to Canada in 1989.

References
General

Specific

 
draft picks
Vancouver Canucks